Gundars Bojārs (born 24 February 1967 in Riga) is a Latvian politician. He was the Mayor of Riga from 2001 to 2005.

References 

1967 births
Living people
Latvian Social Democratic Workers' Party politicians
Latvia's First Party politicians
Latvia's First Party/Latvian Way politicians
Deputies of the 7th Saeima
Mayors of Riga
University of Latvia alumni